Opperzau is a community of the German municipality Windeck, in the Rhein-Sieg district, in the south-eastern part of North Rhine-Westphalia. The southern part of Opperzau is named Oppertsau, which belongs to the municipality Fürthen and belongs to Rhineland-Palatinate. It is located at the middle of the Sieg river.

History 
In 1604, the settlement of Siegburg (Siegburger Vergleich) clarified the limit of the current federal states North Rhine-Westphalia and Rhineland-Palatinate which leads through the village and parted them into Opperzau (northern part) and Oppertsau (southern part). The reason for this was a dispute of a territorial sovereignty that started in 1294, when the County of Sayn-Wittgenstein and other small counties claimed possession over parts of Berg and the Sieg districts.

Traffic 

The roads 112 and 267 extend along Opperzau to other parts of the Altenkirchen district and to districts of Windeck. The public transport is provided by the bus transport company Wilhelm Marenbach, which is headquartered in Opperzau. This bus line is designed only for school transport. Until 1993, Opperzau had a train stop, which is no longer used, due to a lack of passengers.

Rhein-Sieg-Kreis